Guillaume Emmanuel Marie de Quengo de Tonquédec (born 18 October 1966) is a French stage, television and film actor. He first earned fame in his homeland for his role as Renaud Lepic in the TV series Fais pas ci, fais pas ça (2007–2017) on France 2, before winning the César Award for Best Supporting Actor for his performance in What's in a Name? in 2013. De Tonquédec was made a Knight in the Ordre des Arts et des Lettres in 2015 by Minister of Culture Fleur Pellerin.

Career
A native of Paris, Guillaume de Tonquédec grew up in Louveciennes. He studied economics and English at Paris Nanterre University until he joined the Conservatoire national supérieur d'art dramatique in Paris in 1986 for a three-year programme. In 1989, he began his stage career with a national tour in John Millington Synge's The Playboy of the Western World.

He gained recognition in film in Krzysztof Kieslowski's The Double Life of Veronique (1991), followed by his role as Claude Jade's son Jules Martin in List of Merite (1992). In 1996, he starred in Raúl Ruiz's Three Lives and Only One Death.

In 2007, De Tonquédec started starring in the successful TV series Fais pas ci, fais pas ça, which propelled him to stardom in France alongside fellow actors Valérie Bonneton, Isabelle Gélinas and Bruno Salomone. In 2013, he won the César Award for Best Supporting Actor for his role as Claude Gatignol in What's in a Name?. Co-star Valérie Benguigui won the César Award for Best Supporting Actress for her role as Élisabeth Garraud-Larchet. De Tonquédec had been nominated two years prior for the Molière Award for Best Supporting Actor for the same role he held in the eponymous play in Paris's Théâtre Édouard VII, upon which the film was based.

He was subsequently nominated twice for the Molière Award for Best Actor, in 2017 and 2020.

Personal life
Guillaume de Tonquédec, whose ancestors owned the Château de Tonquédec in Brittany from 1626 to 1801 and again from 1828 until 1878, is married to interior designer Christèle Marchal. They reside in L'Étang-la-Ville, Yvelines. They have three children: Amaury, Timothé and Victoire.

Filmography

Book
 Les Portes de mon imaginaire, Éditions de L'Observatoire, 2018

References

External links

 

1966 births
Living people
French male television actors
French male film actors
Place of birth missing (living people)
20th-century French male actors
21st-century French male actors
Best Supporting Actor César Award winners
French male stage actors
Male actors from Paris